James W. Pearson was an English cricketer who played a single first-class match for Northamptonshire in 1932, scoring one run and taking no wickets for 43. He batted and bowled lefthanded. Details of his full name, birth and death are unknown.

Notes

Date of birth unknown
Date of death unknown
English cricketers
Northamptonshire cricketers